Michael Taylor is a film producer and also the former (2004–2014) Chairman of the Division of Film and Television Production at the University of Southern California School of Cinematic Arts.

Taylor is a producer of theatrical and television films.  He began his career as a Motion Picture Executive at United Artists Corporation, and served as UA's European Head of Production based in London. Among other honors, he is the recipient of the Emmy Award, the Fourteenth Annual Genesis Award for Outstanding Feature Film, the National Board of Review Award for Top Independent Film, The Variety/EDI $100 Million Award, and is a member of The Academy of Motion Picture Arts and Sciences. Taylor is also the Founder of the University of Southern California's Media Institute for Social Change (USCMISC) at the School of Cinematic Arts. USCMISC is a nonprofit organization of industry professionals who use cinema to create an awareness of social issues and inspire positive actions throughout the world.

In 1985, he set up a joint venture, with Earle Mack to set up development deals with four pictures through Mack-Taylor Productions, which included two for RKO Pictures and one for Warner Bros. and 20th Century Fox each, with the company setting up headquarters in New York City.

Filmography
He was a producer in all films unless otherwise noted.

Film

Thanks

Television

References

Michael Taylor at U.S.C.

American television producers
American television writers
American male television writers
American television directors
Living people
Year of birth missing (living people)